Notable people named Wharton include:

Politicians and diplomats
 A C Wharton, Former Mayor of Memphis, Tennessee
 Clifton Reginald Wharton, Sr. (1899–1990), American diplomat
 Clifton R. Wharton, Jr. (born 1926), former United States Deputy Secretary of State
James Wharton (born 1984), British politician, ex member of parliament and minister
Jeff Wharton, Canadian provincial politician from Manitoba
 John Austin Wharton (1806-1838), soldier and statesman in the Republic of Texas
 John Wharton (fl.1407-1420), MP for Guildford
 John Wharton (MP for Beverley) (1765-1843)
 John Lloyd Wharton (1837–1912), British Member of Parliament for Durham, 1871–1874, and Ripon, 1886–1906
 Robert Wharton (Philadelphia) (1757–1834), Mayor of Philadelphia
 Thomas Wharton Jr. (1735–1778), Governor of Pennsylvania
 Thomas Wharton, 1st Marquess of Wharton and Malmesbury (1648–1715), English Whig politician, Lord Lieutenant of Ireland
 William H. Wharton (1802–1839), Republic of Texas politician

Sportspeople
 Alan Wharton (1923–1993), English cricketer
 Albert Buckman Wharton, Jr. (a.k.a. Buster Wharton) (1909-1963), American rancher and polo player.
 Arthur Wharton, (1865–1930) Ghanaian-born footballer who played in England
 Ben Wharton, English footballer.
 Jackie Wharton, (1920–2007), English footballer
 Ken Wharton (1916–1957), Formula One racing driver
 Kenny Wharton (born 1960), English footballer
 Louis Wharton (1896–1957), West Indian-born English cricketer
 Shonica Wharton (born 1996), Barbadian netball player
 Tershawn Wharton (born 1998), American football player
 Wharton Davies (1874-1961), Welsh rugby union and rugby league footballer

Other people
 Albert Buckman Wharton III, American rancher.
 Anne Wharton (1659–1685), English poet and playwright
 Edith Wharton (1862–1937), American novelist, short story writer, and designer
 Gabriel C. Wharton (1824–1906), Confederate general in the American Civil War
 Gabriel Caldwell Wharton (1839–1887), Union lieutenant colonel in the American Civil War
 George Wharton, (1618–1681), English pamphleteer and astrologer
 Gordon Wharton, (born 1929), English poet
 Henry Wharton (1664–1695), English writer
 Henry Wharton (soldier), (died 1689) English soldier who served in Ireland
 John A. Wharton (1828–1865), Confederate general during the American Civil War
 John F. Wharton (lawyer) (1894–1977), American entertainment lawyer
 John F. Wharton (general) (born c. 1959), United States Army general
 Joseph Wharton (1826–1909), prominent Philadelphia merchant, industrialist and philanthropist
 Joseph John Cheyne Wharton, (1859–1923), journalist in South Australia and New South Wales
 Michael Wharton (1913–2006), newspaper columnist who wrote under the pseudonym Peter Simple
 Philip Wharton, 4th Baron Wharton (1613–1696), English peer and Parliamentarian during the English Civil War
 Philip Wharton, 1st Duke of Wharton (1698–1731), powerful Jacobite politician, notorious libertine and rake
 Steve Wharton, British academic
 Thomas Wharton, 1st Baron Wharton (1495–1568), English nobleman
 Thomas Wharton, 2nd Baron Wharton (1520–1572), English nobleman
 Thomas Wharton, 1st Marquess of Wharton (1648–1715), English nobleman and politician, credited with being the lyricist of Lilliburlero
 Thomas Wharton Jr. (1735–1778), American politician and 1st President of Pennsylvania
 Thomas Wharton (anatomist) (1614–1673), English anatomist
 Thomas Wharton (author) (born 1963), Canadian novelist
 Tiny Wharton (1927–2005), Scottish soccer referee
 William Wharton (author) (1925–2008), American novelist
 William Wharton (hydrographer) (1843–1905), British admiral and hydrographer
 Baron Wharton, a title of English nobility

English-language surnames
Surnames of British Isles origin
Scottish surnames